David Neesham (born 18 September 1946) is an Australian former water polo player who competed in the 1972 Summer Olympics, in the 1976 Summer Olympics, and in the 1980 Summer Olympics. In 2010, he was inducted into the Water Polo Australia Hall of Fame.

References

External links
 

1946 births
Living people
Australian male water polo players
Olympic water polo players of Australia
Water polo players at the 1972 Summer Olympics
Water polo players at the 1976 Summer Olympics
Water polo players at the 1980 Summer Olympics